The Lesson is a Latvian narrative feature film directed by Andris Gauja and released in 2014. The film is Gauja's debut film. It tells the story of a young teacher, including her relationships with her students, their parents, and her loved ones.

Synopsis 
An attractive Russian-language teacher takes a new job in the Latvian city of Riga, mentoring an unruly group of seniors who are approaching their graduation. She heroically wins her students' trust by holding drunken parties in her apartment and shrewdly takes control of the class; however, one of the male students then begins pursuing her. Gauja directs this suspenseful plot with subtlety and empathy, allowing this character-driven story to unfold with all the messiness of real life.

Film Festivals 

The Lesson has been shown at the following film festivals:

 Montreal World Film Festival – First Films World Competition Program 
 Bergen International Film Festival – Extraordinary Films Program 
 Kinoshock Film Festival (Russia) 
 Chicago International Film Festival – World Cinema Program 
 Connecting Cottbus Film Festival (Germany) – Focus "Queer East"

Cast 
 Inga Alsina as Zane
 Marcis Klatenbergs as Max
 Ieva Apine as Inta
 Gatis Gaga as Uldis
 Ivars Auzins as Eriks (Zane's husband)
 Andrey Smalyakov as Georgiy (Max's father)
 Marina Janaus as School Director
 Aigars Ligers as Olafs (Uldis's son)
 Liena Smukste as Inara
 Edgars Silins as Kristaps
 Elza Feldmane as Evita
 Agirs Neminskis as Alex

Production

Development
The development of this film began late in 2010, when Andris Gauja and Aleksandrs Grebnevs decided to continue their collaboration in the film industry and make a new film. This took place after the release of their award-winning film Family Instinct.

Screenplay
Andris Gauja and Lauris Gundars wrote the screenplay in collaboration.

Casting
The casting for this film was particularly difficult, because Gauja wanted to make a film that would be as realistic and credible as possible. For this reason, very few professional actors were accepted for the roles: instead, most of the characters were portrayed by amateur actors with no previous experience.

Filming
The film was shot in various real-life locations: no scenes were shot in a studio.

Most of the scenes were shot in Riga, Latvia. Two schools were used for the filming: Jāņa Poruka vidusskola and Friča Brīvzemnieka panmatskola

Soundtrack
Tho original music for the film was written by Andris Gauja and several others.

Release
'The Lesson' received its first screening at the Montreal Film festival and subsequently played at various other film festivals, including the Bergen International Film Festival in their 'Extraordinary Films Program', the Kinoshock film festival in Russia, the Chicago International Film Festival in their 'World Cinema Program'  and the Connecting Cottbus Film Festival (Germany) in their 'Spectrum' section.

Critical reception
Many people who had viewed the film, especially women in their late 50s and 60s, were shocked. They described the movie as "outrageous" and claimed that it should not be available for public viewing. This was because they saw the film as an illustration of the worst experiences that could possibly be taken from school, and considered the film's plot unrealistic and untrue.

However, the opinion among younger audiences was much more positive. Younger viewers believed, on the contrary, that school life was not being reflected harshly enough by the film, since real-life situations in schools can often be much worse and far more intense.

In general, this was a film that often attracted strong opinions (whether good or bad) from its audiences.

Home media
The film was released to cinemas on Blu-ray, DVD and DCP, none of which were available for public purchase. After considerable complication with the physical discs, the authors of the film insisted on using digital formats instead.

Awards and nominations
Despite the film's unexpected success in Latvia, 'The Lesson' did not receive any Latvian nominations.

Marketing 
Despite the financial obstacles which the film faced, it was already a well-known topic of intense discussion amongst young people even before its premiere in Latvia.

References 

2014 films
Latvian drama films
Latvian-language films